Mala is a locality situated in Hässleholm Municipality, Skåne County, Sweden with 225 inhabitants.

References 

Populated places in Hässleholm Municipality
Populated places in Skåne County